The Gielgud Award for Excellence in the Dramatic Arts, also known as the Golden Quill, is a prize established in 1994 which is presented by the America-based Shakespeare Guild to "honor Sir John and perpetuate his legacy." The award is named in honor of the English actor Sir John Gielgud..

Background
The Gielgud Award was created in April 1994 at a ceremony at the Folger Shakespeare Library on Capitol Hill in Washington, D.C. The ceremony contained speeches by Robert MacNeil, Tony Randall, and Susan Stamberg, and it was announced that the award would, according to the Shakespeare Guild website, "preserve the heritage of Sir John Gielgud and pay tribute to the actors, directors, producers, and writers who are doing the most to perpetuate his legacy and that of the poet whose work he did so much to convey to succeeding generations of Shakespeare enthusiasts." The award was first presented in 1996 and has been given sporadically ever since.

Recipients

References

External links
Gielgud Award Official Webpage
McKellen's Award
Dench's Award
Branagh's Award
Kahn's Award 
Stewart's Award
Abraham's Award

American awards
Acting awards
American theater awards